The 1924 Dayton Flyers football team was an American football team that represented the University of Dayton as an independent during the 1924 college football season. In its second season under head coach Harry Baujan, the team compiled a 7–3 record.

Schedule

References

Dayton
Dayton Flyers football seasons
Dayton Flyers football